The white-throated nightjar or white-throated eared-nightjar  (Eurostopodus mystacalis) is a species of nightjar in the family Caprimulgidae. It is endemic to eastern Australia; it is a non-breeding winter visitor in Papua New Guinea. Its natural habitat is subtropical or tropical dry forests.

Taxonomy
The white-throated nightjar was formally known as Eurstopodus albogularis but was later reclassified to E. mystacalis. Some texts may still refer to this species as Eurostopodus mystacalis albogularis. This species was regarded as a subspecies and conspecific with Eurostopodus exul and Eurostopodus  nigripennis. However, later research separated the three into their own species based on differences in vocalizations and morphology. Since then, E. mystacalis has remained monotypic.

Etymology

Description

E. mystacalis is the largest Australian nightjar species and measures around 30–37 cm. Males and females are very similar in appearance and display a dark variegated body. The upper body and wings are greyish-brown with broad blackish-brown streaks and spots. The underbody is spotted brown or greyish white and barred rufous.  The upper part of the wing is greyish-white but speckled brownish-black as well. Its neck is buff colored with a large white patch on either side of its throat making it appear as if it's wearing a collar. The four outermost primaries have a distinct white spot that help to differentiate it from similar looking nightjars. Its tail is brown with black speckles and absent of any white. The beak is greyish black and the legs are dark brown and short making travel on ground difficult for this bird.

When in flight, the wings are long, pointed and held above its head. This species bounces buoyantly while flying and takes frequent glides accompanied by a double wing beat.

Distribution and habitat
The white-throated nightjar is a species endemic to eastern Australia. Birds reside in northeast Australia throughout the year and travel to the south to breed. Specifically, their breeding range is in Australia east of the Great Dividing Range, New Caledonia, or the Solomon Islands. Birds are most abundantly found in New South Wales and Queensland. During the winter, birds migrate from February until April to Papua New Guinea as non-breeding visitors. Although most overwinter outside of Australia, there are birds that remain in north and central Queensland all year long.

This species is able inhabit a wide variety of habitats but is most commonly found in dry low-elevation forests. They prefer to nest and roost in dry sclerophyll woodlands with sparse and discontinuous understory. Many individuals have been found to specifically live in woodlands that have experienced disturbances such as forest fires. In New South Wales, birds have been found inhabiting the edges of rainforests and mangroves.  Those that winter in New Guinea occur in savannas, open grasslands, forest edges, marshlands and gardens. Wintering birds may also be found along the beaches of the Solomon Islands.

Behaviour

Vocalisations
White-throated nightjars are often heard more than seen. They have a distinct song that help distinguish it from species it was previously conspecific to. Mostly made by males, their song is composed of a series of rapidly ascending bubbling notes. Their song is described as  containing 9-12 notes and lasting for three to six seconds. It puffs out its throat-patch while singing. Females can occasionally also sing. This song is mostly heard during dawn or dusk and subsides once the breeding season is over.

Their call is also very distinct described as an ascending  for about ten notes which then accelerates into a 'cackle of laughter'.

Adults communicate to their young using low husky notes. In response, chicks make harsh  notes but will cheep when asking for food. If chicks or the nest is threatened, parents can make distracting barks, tocks and hisses. During courtship, both females and males make low croaks and bill snaps to each other.

Diet
This species is a aerial hunting that comes out to forage primarily at night. They employ hawking and target a wide variety of flying insects. Its diet includes mantises, crickets and grasshoppers, beetles, and winged ants, although large moths make up the bulk of its diet. It may form foraging groups of 20 or more individuals especially when on migrations. When migrating, birds travel during the day so they can maximize their time hunting at night.

Reproduction
Breeding season occurs from September to February but differs slightly depending on the region. For birds in southern Australia it is mainly from October–December. The Solomon Islands is October–November and New Caledonia is August–September. Courtship involves males chasing females, displays from the males, and vocal exchanges between both sexes. Males will often land on low branches and wave its wings up and down while calling. 

White-throated nightjars do not make nests and instead lay their eggs directly onto leaf litter or bare soil. The eggs are pale yellow with purplish-brown splotches and clutch size is one. Their preferred nesting sites are on hilltops or stony ridges and they often reuse the same nesting sites every year.  Both sexes are involved in parenting and take turns incubating the egg. During the day, the female will incubate the egg while the males nests nearby. Then at night, the male will take over incubation, allowing the female to hunt for food.  If the nest or nestling are threatened, parents put on a variety of distractions that include short flights, vocal hisses and barks, and flicking tail movements while on the ground. Incubation lasts from 29 to 33 days and newly hatched chicks are precocial. Chicks are quite capable and are mobile starting on the first day. After approximately 30 days, the chick fledges. Three weeks after the first egg hatches, females may lay another egg. If an egg is lost females will lay another egg to replace it and can lay up to 5 eggs per breeding season.

Conservation
Although E. mystacalis is currently listed as least concern, the trend in their overall population is decreasing. They are often traveling along the sides of roads at night searching for food resulting in fatal traffic collisions. Feral cats and dogs prey upon both adults and chicks. Fire ants (Wasmannia auropunctata) introduced in the 1970s have spread into E. mystacalis native range and threaten nestlings. Furthermore, increasing bushfires have affected large parts of the Melaleuca savanna, destroying habitable sites. The current estimate of individuals is unknown.

References

white-throated nightjar
Birds of Queensland
Birds of New South Wales
Birds of Victoria (Australia)
white-throated nightjar
Taxonomy articles created by Polbot